Yoane Wissa (born 3 September 1996) is a professional footballer who plays as a forward and winger for  club Brentford.  Born in France, he represents DR Congo at international level.

A product of the Châteauroux academy, Wissa began his senior career with the club in 2015 and following a spell with Angers, he was transferred to Lorient in 2018. He was a part of the Lorient team, which finished the 2019–20 season as Ligue 2 champions, and following a season in Ligue 1, he joined Brentford in 2021.

Club career

Early years 
Wissa began his youth career as a goalkeeper at the age of seven. He played for his local youth club Épinay-sous-Sénart, before moving to midfield and then the forward line. As his youth career progressed, he also became adept as a winger and number 10. Wissa began his senior career as a forward with Châteauroux and progressed through the reserve team to break into the first team during the 2015–16 Championnat National season, which he finished with 24 appearances and seven goals. A transfer to Ligue 1 club Angers followed in 2016, but Wissa managed just two substitute appearances during the first half of the 2016–17 season and he played much of 2017 away on loan at Ligue 2 clubs Stade Laval and Ajaccio. Wissa departed the Stade Raymond Kopa in January 2018.

Lorient 
In January 2018, Wissa transferred to Ligue 2 club Lorient and immediately established himself at the promotion-chasing club. Promotion to Ligue 1 was attained at the end of the 2019–20 season, when Wissa's 15 goals in 28 appearances helped the club to the Ligue 2 championship. He made 38 appearances and scored 10 goals during the 2020–21 season, in which Lorient narrowly avoided finishing in the relegation playoff places. Wissa departed the club in August 2021 and finished his -year stay at the Stade du Moustoir with 128 appearances and 37 goals.

Brentford 
On 10 August 2021, Wissa moved to England to join newly-promoted Premier League club Brentford on a four-year contract, with the option of a further year, for an undisclosed fee, reported to be £8.5 million. The transfer had been in the works for two years and he had turned down the opportunity to move to the Community Stadium during the previous transfer window. Despite being unable to link up with the club during pre-season due to having undergone eye surgery, Wissa scored five goals in his first six appearances for the club. His brace in a 7–0 EFL Cup third round win over Oldham Athletic on 21 September 2021 was recognised with a place in the EFL Cup Team of the Round and his second goal, a bicycle kick, was voted Goal of the Round and Goal of the Tournament. Wissa's goalscoring run was ended by an ankle knock suffered in mid-October 2021. He returned to match play two months later and was deployed in a mixture of starting and substitute roles through to the end of the season, which included a run of six starts during the final 9 matches of the season. Wissa ended the 2021–22 season with 34 appearances and 10 goals.

International career
Wissa won his maiden call into the DR Congo squad for a pair of friendly matches in October 2020. He scored his first two international goals on his second and third caps, in friendly and 2022 FIFA World Cup qualifying matches versus Morocco respectively.

Style of play 
Wissa has been described as a player who "fits many different positions", including winger, number 10 and forward. He has "pace and power", is "a threat in behind", "has good ability to take on players and create overloads" and "good pressing abilities".

Personal life
Born in France of Congolese descent, Wissa can speak the Lingala language. Prior to making the decision to concentrate on football at age 15, he also played rugby union. He was the subject of an alleged acid attack in July 2021 and made a full recovery from emergency eye surgery.

Career statistics

Club

International 

Scores and results list DR Congo's goal tally first, score column indicates score after each Wissa goal

Honours 
Lorient
 Ligue 2: 2019–20

References

External links

 

Yoane Wissa at brentfordfc.com

1996 births
Living people
Footballers from Essonne
Democratic Republic of the Congo footballers
French footballers
Association football forwards
ESA Linas-Montlhéry players
LB Châteauroux players
Angers SCO players
Stade Lavallois players
AC Ajaccio players
FC Lorient players
Brentford F.C. players
Championnat National 3 players
Championnat National players
Ligue 1 players
Ligue 2 players
Premier League players
Democratic Republic of the Congo international footballers
Democratic Republic of the Congo expatriate footballers
French expatriate footballers
Expatriate footballers in England
Democratic Republic of the Congo expatriate sportspeople in England
French expatriate sportspeople in England
Black French sportspeople
French sportspeople of Democratic Republic of the Congo descent
Acid attack victims